The Rugby Championship of Czechoslovakia was a rugby club competition played in Czechoslovakia. It was played from 1929 to 1992, after which it was replaced by the KB Extraliga and the KB První Liga.

Results

External links
 Archives du Rugby: republique Tcheque

Rugby union in Czechoslovakia
1929 establishments in Czechoslovakia
1992 disestablishments in Czechoslovakia
Recurring sporting events established in 1929